The LTA mixed double sculls competition at the 2016 World Rowing Championships in Rotterdam took place at the Willem-Alexander Baan.

Schedule
The schedule was as follows:

All times are Central European Summer Time (UTC+2)

Results

Exhibition race
With fewer than seven entries in this event, boats contested a race for lanes before the final.

Final
The final determined the rankings.

References

2016 World Rowing Championships